Borislav Krastev Gidikov (born November 3, 1965 in Pazardzhik, Pazardzhik Province) is a former Bulgarian weightlifter. He became Olympic Champion in 1988 in the middleweight class. His career continues from 1979 to 1990. Until 1983 he was a competitor of Hebar Pazardzhik, and then until 1990 he was a competitor of Slavia Sofia. His personal trainers were Hristo Popov and Lyudmil Kochev. In the national team of Bulgaria was trained by the great Ivan Abadjiev. The story of how Borislav chose weightlifting before football is interesting. His father was a bus driver at Hebar football club. When Gidikov wondered which sport to choose in the beginning, his father told him that in football he would depend on another 10 people, and in weightlifting he would depend only on himself. So Borislav chose weightlifting to become one of the greatest Bulgarian weightlifters in the 1980s. His most notable success was in 1988, when he made six successful attempts at the Seoul Olympics to win the gold medal in cat. 75 kg. He is currently Secretary General of the Bulgarian Weightlifting Federation.

References

External links

1965 births
Living people
Bulgarian male weightlifters
Sportspeople from Pazardzhik
People from Pazardzhik Province
Weightlifters at the 1988 Summer Olympics
Olympic gold medalists for Bulgaria
Olympic medalists in weightlifting
Olympic weightlifters of Bulgaria
Medalists at the 1988 Summer Olympics
World record setters in weightlifting
European Weightlifting Championships medalists
World Weightlifting Championships medalists